Fablehaven: Secrets of the Dragon Sanctuary is the fourth novel in The New York Times''' bestselling Fablehaven series.

This book starts off at the end of the third book, where the society of the Evening Star make some dangerous moves. Seth and Kendra are thrust into another dangerous adventure, where they leave the preserve and explore others. In this one they visit a preserve for dragons, wyrmroost, strange changes are wrought in Seth, and the society go farther than they ever have. Its sequel is the last book in the main series - Fablehaven: Keys to the Demon Prison.

Plot summary
Just before Christmas break, Kendra is kidnapped by a member of the Society of the Evening Star and replaced by a Stingbulb (a plant that, once it stings someone, will grow into a perfect replica, but die after a few days). Warren and Seth notice something odd with the clone after they intercept a letter revealing secrets, but when they confront it, it swallows a pill and dies. They bury the clone (unaware it is not Kendra) and return to Fablehaven. Meanwhile, Kendra is taken to the home of a lectoblix (able to drain the youth out of people) named Torina to await a meeting with the Sphinx.

The Sphinx arrives and forces Kendra to use the Oculus, one of the magical artifacts that can open the door to Zzyzx. With it, Kendra is able to see everywhere at once, but it becomes overwhelming. The Fairy Queen is able to help Kendra release the crystal. Back at Fablehaven, another stingbulb infiltrates the group, this time in the form of Maddox. He releases Vanessa from the Quiet Box, but she knocks him unconscious and tells Grandpa Sorenson. With her help, they discover a plan to rescue Kendra, but the group is still distrustful of her. Kendra receives a note and a knapsack that has a magical room in it and a stingbulb. She creates a clone of herself, enters the knapsack, and escapes the house. She is picked up by Trask, a Knight of the Dawn, and returned to Fablehaven.

In the journal of Patton Burgess, Kendra learns there is a secret message about where the other magical artifacts are. They read the message and learn about the Ocolus, as well as the Translocator. In order to recover the Translocator they must go to the Dragon Sanctuary and recover a key. To enter the sanctuary, they must obtain a unicorn horn. In the Hall of Dread Seth is able to hear the whispers of the shades imprisoned there.

The only unicorn horn in Fablehaven was the property of the centaurs, but they refuse to let the group borrow it. Seth hears Graulus (the demon) call for him. He sneaks out to see him and there he learns he is a Shadow Charmer, and that he is able to hide in dim light, communicate with dark creatures, see magically invisible objects, and is immune to magical fear. With these skills he successfully steals the unicorn horn from the centaurs. With the horn, Kendra, Dougan, Trask, Mara, Gavin, Warren, and Tanu set off to the Dragon Sanctuary to recover the key. Seth is hiding in the magical knapsack.

They arrive at the Sanctuary and meet the caretaker Agad - a dragon who became human in order to become a great wizard. He gives them directions to the Fairy Shrine in Thronis's (a sky Giant) domain. On the way they meet a dragon (Nafia) and Warren gets injured and must remain in the knapsack. When they arrive, Thronis captures everyone except Warren and Kendra. Kendra meets a fairy dragon named Raxtus who is very nice and agrees to help her get to the Fairy Shrine. There, Kendra learns the way to the Dragon Temple. Raxtus agrees to take her there, but refuses to help further as it would be a betrayal to dragons. Meanwhile, Seth helps the group strike a deal with Thronis to obtain some items from the Temple in exchange for their freedom.

The group meets back up at the entrance to the temple. They survive the Hydra, kill Grommus (the group is put to sleep but Vanessa takes over Tanu's body and slays the dragon) and Seth and Kendra team up to use the unicorn horn to kill Silleta the poison dragon. Mendigo is dissolved in the process. Gavin heads back to try to deal with the Hydra, while the remaining group gathers the items for Thronis and the key.

When they leave the temple they are ambushed by 2 dragons. Tanu and Seth escape on Griffins to Thronis's tower. Gavin (who is Navarog, the Demon prince dragon) turns into a dragon, eats Dougan, and fights off the 2 dragons. Kendra escapes a cleft, and Gavin is forced to take human shape again to get to her. He destroys the knapsack (trapping Warren inside) and takes the key and the unicorn horn. Raxtus, small and invisible as he is, sneaks up behind Gavin and eats him.

The remaining group returns to Fablehaven with the key, and returns the horn to the centaurs, claiming they rescued it from the Society of the Evening Star. They begin to make plans to recover the next artifact. It is revealed that Kendra and Seth's parents have been kidnapped by the society.

 Author's interview 
Brandon Mull had an interview with SciFiChick in March 2009, and had a lot to say about his book. When Mull was asked where he go his ideas from his unique characters he said that "most of the creatures at Fablehaven and the other magical wildlife parks in the books come from different myths and legends. I borrow from Greek mythology, German and Scandinavian folklore, even Native American legends". Mull feels that his job as an author is to take familiar mythical creatures and figure out how they fit into his books. When asked where his inspiration came from Mull said: "Reading great books, seeing great movies. Getting outside also inspires me. I love dramatic landscapes. Wyrmroost, the dragon sanctuary in Fablehaven'' Book 4, came to life in my mind after a visit to Glacier National Park".

Book review 
The book was given 4.9 stars out of 5, based on 1,039 global ratings.

References

External links
 Official Fablehaven series site



2009 American novels
Fablehaven series
Novels by Brandon Mull
Shadow Mountain Publishing books